Douglas is a blank verse tragedy by John Home. It was first performed in 1756 in Edinburgh.

The play was a big success in both Scotland and England for decades, attracting many notable actors of the period, such as Edmund Kean, who made his debut in it. Peg Woffington played Lady Randolph, a part which found a later exponent in Sarah Siddons.

The opening lines of the second act are probably the best known:

Plot
Lady Randolph opens the play mourning for her brother. Shortly thereafter, she discloses to her maid that she was married to the son of her father's enemy. She was not able to acknowledge the marriage or the son that she bore. She sent her maid away with her son to the maid's sister's house. They were lost in a storm and never heard from again.

Young Norval, the hero, is left outside shortly after birth to die of exposure. However, the baby is saved by a shepherd — Old Norval 
 — and thus gains his name. He is in fact the son of Lady Randolph (daughter of Sir Malcolm), by Douglas, and he is briefly reunited with her.

Sir Malcolm exposes the child, but Young Norval is given a commission in the army.

When he saves the life of Lord Randolph, the lord becomes indebted to him, and Young Norval gains the envy of Glenalvon who is the lord's heir.

As was common in Romanticism, many of the main characters die, except for Lord Randolph. Lady Randolph takes her life, after hearing of the death of Young Norval who has been killed by Lord Randolph, who was deceived by Glenalvon. In turn, Young Norval had killed Glenalvon, because Glenalvon had been spreading lies about him.

Theme and response

The theme was suggested to him by hearing a lady sing the ballad of "Gil Morrice" or "Child Maurice" (FJ Child, Popular Ballads, ii. 263). The ballad supplied him with the outline of a simple and striking plot. It was Home's second verse drama, after Agis.

After five years, he completed his play and took it to London for David Garrick's opinion. It was rejected, like Agis, but on his return to Edinburgh, his friends resolved that it should be produced there. It was performed on 14 December 1756 with overwhelming success, in spite of the opposition of the presbytery, who summoned Alexander Carlyle to answer for having attended its representation. Home wisely resigned his charge in 1757, after a visit to London, where Douglas was brought out at Covent Garden on 14 March.

David Hume summed up his admiration for Douglas by saying that his friend possessed "the true theatric genius of Shakespeare and Otway, refined from the unhappy barbarism of the one and licentiousness of the other." Gray, writing to Horace Walpole (August 1757), said that the author "seemed to have retrieved the true language of the stage, which has been lost for these hundred years," but Samuel Johnson held aloof from the general enthusiasm, and averred that there were not ten good lines in the whole play.

Douglas also elicited the famous Edinburgh audience exclamation, "Whaur's Yer Wullie Shakespeare Noo?," a remark meant to imply the superiority of the Scottish Home's superiority to the famous English playwright. The play was also the subject of a number of pamphlets both supportive and antagonistic. It also arguably influenced James MacPherson's Ossian cycle.

Because Home was hounded by the church authorities for Douglas, he resigned from the Ministry in 1758, and became a layman. It may have been this persecution which drove Home to write for the London stage, in addition to Douglas''' success there, and stopped him from founding the new Scottish national theatre that some had hoped he would.

Literary references

Jane Austen's Mansfield Park (1814) and George Eliot's The Mill on the Floss (1860) both allude to the line "My name is Norval".

Young George Osborne recites it, eliciting tears from his aunt, in Thackeray's Vanity Fair (1847–48), p. 504.

Harry Walmers in Charles Dickens' The Boots at the Holly Tree Inn also refers to it:

There is also another reference to Norval in Nicholas Nickleby, when Wackford Squeers, while in custody, refers to his son as "a young Norval", supposedly the darling of the town.

Rev. George B. Cheever, American divine and abolitionist, references it in his 1857 broadside God Against Slavery. He recalls the recital by himself, when a boy, of the famous opening of the second act. Cheever then compares old Norval, who only sought to increase his flock and selfishly kept Douglas at home to do it, with those modern merchants who try to keep down anti-slavery agitation because it is bad for business (Cheever was well known in his time, and was listed by Edgar Allan Poe as one of the "Literati of New York City" in his famous 1846 series of articles of that name).

Hugh MacDiarmid, the twentieth century pioneer of the Scottish Renaissance, included the following lines in A Drunk Man Looks at the Thistle (1922):

Also referenced in George B. Shaw's play You Never Can Tell by the twins, Philip and Dolly.

See also
William Warren (elder actor)

References

 Ousby (ed) Cambridge Companion to Literature in English (1993)
 Drabble, Margaret (ed.) The Oxford Companion to English Literature'' (fifth edition) 1985)

External links
 Broadside ballad entitled 'Norval on the Grampian Hills'

1756 plays
Censorship in Christianity
Christianity in popular culture controversies
History of Christianity in Scotland
History of Edinburgh
Plays set in Scotland
1756 in Scotland
Culture in Edinburgh
Tragedy plays
Plays by John Home